The siege of Hlukhiv (Glukhov, Głuchów) took place during the Russo-Polish War of 1654–67. The army of king Jan II Casimir, numbering 50,000 men, unsuccessfully besieged the Russo-Ukrainian garrison of Hlukhiv and finally retreated under pressure from the Russian army of prince Grigory Romodanovsky. The siege and the following retreat, during which the Polish army became the target of Russian attacks, proved to be one of the worst defeats in the whole course of war.

Background
In November 1663 Jan II Casimir and Hetman of Right-bank Ukraine, Pavlo Teteria, began an offensive against Left-bank Ukraine with an army of 130,000 (including camp followers). Without sufficient forces to stop the offensive, Grigory Romodanovsky and Ivan Briukhovetsky retreated to Putyvl. Proceeding almost without resistance, the army of Jan II Casimir ultimately besieged Hlukhiv, which was defended by the Cossacks of the Kievan polkovnik Vasily Dvoretsky and the Russian streltsy of Avraam Lopukhin.

Battle
With the help of artillery and explosives the Polish army managed to destroy some parts of the wall. Jan Sobieski personally led the troops during the storming of the town. The Poles entered the town, but blundered into an ambush and came under heavy artillery and musket fire. Having lost about 4,000 men, including 200 officers, the Polish army was forced to retreat. Duke Antoine III de Gramont, who at that time was an officer in the army of John II Casimir, reported that the small Russian garrison showed miraculous bravery and excellent artillery skills.

Eight days later the King ordered a repeat of the storming. The Polish army once again managed to penetrate the fortress, but the counter-attack of the garrison drove the attackers out of it. De Gramont describes the storming as almost successful but once again expresses his surprise how the Russians recaptured the openings in the walls and how efficiently they fired back in spite of heavy Polish artillery fire aimed at them. The Polish army again experienced heavy losses.

Meanwhile, Prince Romodanovsky arrived at Hlukhiv with his army of 45,000 Russian soldiers and Cossacks. Simultaneously, many Left-bank Ukraine cities, which had previously surrendered without fighting, rebelled against the Polish occupation. The rebellions also spread into Right-bank Ukraine. Wishing to avoid a great battle, Jan II Casimir lifted the siege.

Polish retreat
Pursued by the Russian forces, the Polish army retreated to Novhorod-Siverskyi. During the retreat, the Poles executed Ivan Bohun, who was suspected of handing over important information to the Hlukhiv garrison.

The defence of Hlukhiv ruined the Polish plans of bringing Left-bank Ukraine back under the control of the Polish–Lithuanian Commonwealth. In the following years, Poland was afflicted with internal conflicts (Lubomirski's Rokosz) and active fighting on the Polish–Russian front came to an end. Finally, the Treaty of Andrusovo was signed in 1667, formally ending the armed conflict.

References

Literature
 Малов А.В. Русско-польская война 1654-1667 гг. Москва, Цейхгауз, 2006. .

Conflicts in 1664
Hlukhiv
1664 in Europe